The Elizabeth W. Jones Award for Excellence in Education is awarded annually by the Genetics Society of America to recognize individuals who have made noteworthy contributions to genetics education. It was founded in 2007 as the Genetics Society of America Award for Excellence in Education. Its first recipient was Elizabeth W. Jones, after whom the award was renamed following her death in 2008.

Recipients
Source: Genetics Society of America

2007: Elizabeth W. Jones
2008: R. Scott Hawley
2009: Sarah Elgin
2010: Utpal Banerjee
2011: Peter J. Bruns
2012: David A. Micklos
2013: A. Malcolm Campbell
2014: Robin Wright
2015: Louisa A. Stark
2016: William Wood
2017: Sally G. Hoskins
2018: Steven A. Farber, Carnegie Institute for Science & Jamie Shuda
2019: Bruce Weir
2020: Seth Bordenstein, Vanderbilt University

See also

 List of genetics awards

References

Genetics awards
Awards established in 2007
Genetics education
American education awards